Only God Can Judge Me is the debut EP released by British singer Mark Morrison and the follow up to his successful debut studio album, Return of the Mack. The title originated from his on stage protest during the BRIT Awards when it was emblazoned in front of his black long sleeve top.

The EP was released in the U.S. as The Judgement.

It contains the UK top 20 hit "Who's the Mack!".

Track listing
"Headlines"
"Who's the Mack!"
"Lord's Prayer Pt. 1"
"Only God Can Judge Me"
"NEC 96"
"Macklife"
"Lisa at Lunchtime"
"Blackstabbers"
"Lord's Prayer Pt. 2"

Samples
 The track "Who's the Mack!" samples the DJ Quik song "Dollaz & Sense".
 The tracks "Headlines" and "Only God Can Judge Me" use elements from The Roots' track "What They Do".

1997 debut EPs
Mark Morrison albums